Charles Gordon, 2nd Earl of Aboyne (c. 1670 – April 1702). The eldest son of Charles Gordon, 1st Earl of Aboyne and Elizabeth Lyon, he succeeded his father as 2nd Earl of Aboyne in March 1681. At the time of his death in April 1702, he was succeeded in his titles by his son.

Family
He married Elizabeth Lyon, daughter of Patrick Lyon, 3rd Earl of Strathmore and Kinghorne and Helen Middleton, c1662, and had issue:
Lady Helen Gordon (d. c1731), married George Kinnaird
John Gordon, 3rd Earl of Aboyne (d. 1732)
Lady Elizabeth Gordon (d. 1770)
Lady Grizel Gordon (d. 1761), married James Grant

References

Kidd, Charles, Williamson, David (editors). Debrett's Peerage and Baronetage (2003 edition). London: Pan Macmillan, 2003., 

Cracroft's Peerage

1670 births
1702 deaths
Earls of Aboyne
17th-century Scottish peers